In formal theories of truth, a truth predicate is a fundamental concept based on the sentences of a formal language as interpreted logically. That is, it formalizes the concept that is normally expressed by saying that a sentence, statement or idea "is true."

Languages which allow a truth predicate

Based on "Chomsky Definition", a language is assumed to be a countable set of sentences, each of finite length, and constructed out of a countable set of symbols. A theory of syntax is assumed to introduce symbols, and rules to construct well-formed sentences. A language is called fully interpreted if meanings are attached to its sentences so that they all are either true or false.

A fully interpreted language L which does not have a truth predicate can be extended to a fully interpreted language Ľ
that contains a truth predicate T, i.e., the sentence A ↔ T(⌈A⌉) is true for every sentence A of Ľ, where T(⌈A⌉) stands for "the sentence (denoted by) A is true". The main tools to prove this result are ordinary and transfinite induction, recursion methods, and ZF set theory (cf. 
and  ).

See also

 Pluralist theory of truth

References

Mathematical logic
Theories of truth